is a former Japanese football player. He last played for Japan national team until 2011. 

His younger brother Kodai is also a professional footballer playing for Ehime FC.

Club career

Yasuda was born in Kobe on 20 December 1987, and was raised in Suita, Osaka from the age of five. He joined Gamba Osaka from youth team in 2006. On 5 January 2011 a deal was announced between Gamba Osaka and Dutch side Vitesse Arnhem. Yasuda is the first Japanese footballer at Vitesse Arnhem.

On 26 January 2022, Yasuda announced would be joining to Matsumoto Yamaga.

After leaving from the club, On 4 January 2023, Yasuda was announced would retirement from football after 16 years career as professional football.

National team career
In July 2007, Yasuda was elected Japan U-20 national team for 2007 U-20 World Cup. At this tournament, he played all 4 matches as mainly left side back. In August 2008, he was elected Japan U-23 national team for 2008 Summer Olympics. At this tournament, he played 1 match.

In February 2008, Yasuda was elected Japan national team for 2008 East Asian Football Championship. At this tournament, on 17 February, he debuted against North Korea.

Career statistics

Club
Updated to 4 December 2017.

1Includes AFC Champions League, FIFA Club World Cup and UEFA Europa League.
2Includes Japanese Super Cup, Eredivisie Playoffs and K League play-offs.

International

International goals
Scores and results list Japan's goal tally first.

Under-20

Senior team

Appearances in major competitions

Awards and honours

Club
Gamba Osaka
Emperor's Cup (2) : 2008, 2009
J. League Cup (1) : 2007
Japanese Super Cup (1) : 2007
AFC Champions League (1) : 2008
Pan-Pacific Championship (1) : 2008

Individual
J. League Cup Most Valuable Player (1) : 2007
J. League Cup New Hero Award (1) : 2007

References

External links

Profile at Albirex Niigata 

Japan National Football Team Database

1987 births
Living people
Association football people from Hyōgo Prefecture
Association football people from Osaka Prefecture
Sportspeople from Kobe
People from Suita
Japanese footballers
Japan youth international footballers
Japan international footballers
J1 League players
J2 League players
Eredivisie players
Gamba Osaka players
SBV Vitesse players
Júbilo Iwata players
Sagan Tosu players
Vissel Kobe players
Nagoya Grampus players
Albirex Niigata players
JEF United Chiba players
Olympic footballers of Japan
Footballers at the 2008 Summer Olympics
Japanese expatriate footballers
Expatriate footballers in the Netherlands
Japanese expatriate sportspeople in the Netherlands
Association football defenders